Mary Costello Daniel is a General District Court Judge for the 26th Judicial District of Virginia.

Early life and education
Daniel was born in Winchester, Virginia to the late Lewis M. Costello and Joy Hollar Costello, and raised in Frederick County, Virginia. She received her undergraduate degree from the University of Virginia. Daniel then obtained a juris doctor from the T.C. Williams School of Law at the University of Richmond.

Career
Daniel began practicing law in 1993 in Martinsburg, West Virginia and moved to Berryville, Virginia, in 1996 to join the pw firm of Hobert, Kerr & Perka P.C. In 1998, Daniel opened her own law practice in Winchester, Virginia. Daniel was the Virginia Managing Attorney at Booth, Strange & Daniel, a trade name for the Central Atlantic Legal Group, from late 2017 until May, 2020. Daniel also worked as a part-time assistant commonwealth's attorney in Winchester from 1998, prosecuting domestic violence and sexual assault cases.

In 2009, then-Delegate (later to become Judge) Clay Athey invited Daniel to interview for a vacant position, and she realized that a judgeship eventually might be possible for her. She then interviewed on-and-off for ten years. In March 2020, Daniel was appointed as a General District Court Judge for the 26th Judicial District of Virginia. She began her term on June 1, 2020.

References

Living people
20th-century American lawyers
21st-century American judges
University of Richmond alumni
University of Virginia alumni
Virginia lawyers
20th-century American women lawyers
21st-century American women judges
Year of birth missing (living people)